Octeville-sur-Mer (literally Octeville on Sea) is a commune in the Seine-Maritime department, Normandy, northern France and is twinned with Bourne End (Bucks) in United Kingdom since 2003 and with Furci Siculo (Sicily) in Italy since 2010.

Geography
The commune covers a large area, and boasts an airport (of Le Havre), a golf course and several small villages and hamlets.

Heraldry

Population

Places of interest

 The church of St. Martin, dating from the thirteenth century.
 The church of St. Barthélemy, dating from the seventeenth century.
 The remains of some World War II artillery defences.

See also
Communes of the Seine-Maritime department

References

External links

 Official commune website 
 The Octeville sur Mer twinning association website

Communes of Seine-Maritime
Populated coastal places in France